Gold(III) fluoride, is an orange solid that sublimes at 300 °C. It is a powerful fluorinating agent. It is very sensitive to moisture, yielding gold(III) hydroxide and hydrofluoric acid.

Preparation 
AuF3 can be prepared by reacting AuCl3 with F2 or BrF3.

Structure 
The crystal structure of AuF3 consists of spirals of square-planar AuF4 units.

References

External links

Fluorides
Metal halides
Gold(III) compounds
Fluorinating agents
Gold–halogen compounds